The Junior women's race at the 1992 IAAF World Cross Country Championships was held in Boston, Massachusetts, United States, at the Franklin Park on March 21, 1992.   A report on the event was given in The New York Times.

Complete results, medallists, and the results of British athletes were published.

Race results

Junior women's race (4.005 km)

Individual

Teams

Note: Athletes in parentheses did not score for the team result

Participation
An unofficial count yields the participation of 106 athletes from 29 countries in the Junior women's race.  This is in agreement with the official numbers as published.

 (3)
 (1)
 (4)
 (1)
 (6)
 (4)
 (1)
 (1)
 (4)
 (6)
 (1)
 (6)
 (5)
 (5)
 (3)
 (1)
 (5)
 (4)
 (6)
 (5)
 (2)
 (1)
 (5)
 (1)
 (5)
 (6)
 (2)
 (6)
 (6)

See also
 1992 IAAF World Cross Country Championships – Senior men's race
 1992 IAAF World Cross Country Championships – Junior men's race
 1992 IAAF World Cross Country Championships – Senior women's race

References

Junior women's race at the World Athletics Cross Country Championships
IAAF World Cross Country Championships
1992 in women's athletics
1992 in youth sport